A. J. Gale (born February 23, 1987) is a Canadian former professional ice hockey player. He last played professionally with the Denver Cutthroats of the Central Hockey League (CHL).

Playing career
Undrafted, Gale originally played in the British Columbia Hockey League with the Nanaimo Clippers and at a collegiate level with St. Cloud State University and St. Norbert College.

Gale made his professional debut in the Central Hockey League in the 2009–10 season with the Fort Worth Brahmas before moving to the Wichita Thunder the following season and scoring at a point-per-game pace. In his third professional season, Gale left as a free agent to experience European hockey, initially signing with Copenhagen Hockey of the Danish AL-Bank Ligaen on May 4, 2011.

As an offensively skilled forward, Gale tallied 14 points in 14 games with Copenhagen during the 2011–12 season, before transferring to Sweden on October 28, with Asplöven HC of Division 1. In the remainder of the season, Gale was amongst the club's scoring leaders, scoring 17 goals and 32 points in just 27 games.

Gale returned to North America the following the completion of his season in Sweden and signed a one-year contract with the inaugural Denver Cutthroats of the CHL. His signing on August 8, 2012 marked a reunion alongside former Wichita Thunder team and line mate Troy Schwab. During the 2012–13 season, Gale formed the top scoring line in the CHL alongside Schwab and former NHL veteran Brad Smyth, leading the CHL with 46 goals in just 64 games. On February 20, 2013, Gale was called up to play four games with the American Hockey League affiliate, the Lake Erie Monsters. In returning to the Cutthroats, he finished fourth in league scoring with 84 points and was a finalist for league MVP, before being selected to the All-CHL team.

On August 6, 2013, Gale re-signed on a one-year deal for a second season with the Cutthroats.

Career statistics

Awards and honours

References

External links

1987 births
Asplöven HC players
Canadian ice hockey forwards
Copenhagen Hockey players
Denver Cutthroats players
Fort Worth Brahmas players
Ice hockey people from British Columbia
Lake Erie Monsters players
Living people
Manchester Monarchs (AHL) players
Sportspeople from Nanaimo
St. Cloud State Huskies men's ice hockey players
Wichita Thunder players
Canadian expatriate ice hockey players in Denmark
Canadian expatriate ice hockey players in Sweden